Franco Eduardo Mazurek (born 24 September 1993) is an Argentine professional footballer who plays as a midfielder for Ethnikos Achna.

Career

Panetolikos
On 6 July 2017, Panetolikos officially announced the signing of Franco Eduardo Mazurek, who was previously a member of Palestino, until the summer of 2019. The 24-year-old Argentine attacking midfielder has also been a member of Boca Juniors in the beginning of his career, while he is a close friend of Panaitolikos' defensive midfielder Federico Bravo. On 23 September 2017 he scored his first goal for the club in a 2-0 home win against Panathinaikos. On 4 November 2017 he scored his team's goal in a 3-1 home loss against Xanthi. On 26 November 2017 Franco scored in a 3-1 home win against AEL, which was the first since matchday 6. Four days later he scored in a triumphic 5-0 away win against Ergotelis for the group stages of the Greek Cup.

He scored in the 2018–19 season's opener, a 2-1 home loss against Atromitos. On 24 September 2018, he scored with a stunning volley in a 2-2 home draw against Lamia. On 20 October 2018, he was the MVP of a 2-0 away win against PAS Giannina, scoring both goals.

On 11 February 2019, he scored opened the score in an eventual 2-2 home draw against AEL. On 11 March 2019, he was the MVP of an emphatic 5-0 home win against Panionios, scoring a brace and giving one assist.

The 26-year old, who has impressed with his performances during the season, having recorded 7 goals and 4 assists in 27 games, is out of contract next summer and has attracted interest from Panathinaikos and Atromitos.

Levski Sofia
On 20 June 2019 Mazurek signed a 2-year contract with Bulgarian side Levski Sofia, making him the first Argentinian to ever play for the club.

Return to Panetolikos
On 12 August 2020, Panetolikos officially announced the return of the Argentine, who signed a contract until the summer of 2021.

References

External links
 
 
 Profile at LevskiSofia.info

1993 births
Living people
Argentine footballers
Argentine expatriate footballers
All Boys footballers
Boca Juniors footballers
Crucero del Norte footballers
Club Atlético Colón footballers
C.D. Olmedo footballers
Club Deportivo Palestino footballers
Panetolikos F.C. players
PFC Levski Sofia players
AEL Limassol players
Ethnikos Achna FC players
Argentine Primera División players
Primera Nacional players
Chilean Primera División players
Ecuadorian Serie A players
Super League Greece players
First Professional Football League (Bulgaria) players
Cypriot First Division players
Expatriate footballers in Chile
Expatriate footballers in Ecuador
Expatriate footballers in Greece
Expatriate footballers in Bulgaria
Expatriate footballers in Cyprus
Argentine people of Polish descent
Association football midfielders
Sportspeople from Misiones Province